The Indian Revenue Service, often abbreviated as IRS, is an Indian government agency that is primarily responsible for collecting and administering direct and indirect taxes. As a central civil service under Group A of the executive branch of the Government of India, it functions under the Department of Revenue of the Ministry of Finance and is under the administrative direction of the Revenue Secretary and the ministerial command of the Minister of Finance. 

The IRS comprises two branches, Indian Revenue Service (Income Tax) and Indian Revenue Service (Custom & Indirect Taxes), controlled by two separate statutory bodies, the Central Board of Direct Taxes (CBDT) and the Central Board of Indirect Taxes and Customs (CBIC). The duties of the IRS (IT) include among others, formulation of domestic direct tax policy (through the Tax Policy and Legislation Section), formulation of international tax policy (through the Foreign Tax and Tax Research Division), handling policy matters in respect of investigation of tax evasion (through the Investigation Section), updating, resolving and maintaining the relevant laws (through the ITA Division), administering the direct tax policy (through its field offices across the country), and administering all the associated administrative functions pertaining to direct taxes. The duties of the IRS (C&IT) include formulation and enforcement of policy concerning the Goods and Services Tax, prevention of smuggling, and administration of matters related to Customs and Narcotics.

In the 2017-18 financial year (i.e. 1 April 2017 to 31 March 2018), the IRS (IT) received 5,87,13,458 returns and collected direct taxes amounting to ₹11.37 trillion, spending  for every  it collected. The relative contribution of direct tax to the overall tax collection of the Central Government has risen from about 36% to 56% over the period of 2000–01 to 2013–14. The contribution of direct tax-to-GDP has doubled (from about 3% to 6%) during the same period.

History

Indian Revenue Service (Income Tax)

Direct tax in the form of an income tax was introduced by Sir James Wilson (Britisher) in India in 1860 to overcome the difficulties created by the Indian Rebellion of 1857. The organisational history of the Income-tax Department, however, starts in the year 1922, when the Income-tax Act, 1922 gave, for the first time, a specific nomenclature to various Income-tax authorities. In 1924, the Central Board of Revenue Act constituted a Central Board of Revenue – the statutory body with functional responsibilities for administering the Income Tax Act.

Commissioners of income tax were appointed for each province, and assistant commissioners and tax officers were placed under their control. Officers from the Imperial Civil Services (ICS) manned top posts and the lower echelons were filled through promotions from the ranks. The Income Tax Service was established in 1944 and was subsequently re-constituted as the Indian Revenue Service (Income Tax) in 1953.

In 1963, given the increasingly complex roles and responsibilities of administering direct tax in India, the Central Board of Direct Taxes was constituted as a statutory body under the Central Board of Revenue Act, 1963.

Indian Revenue Service (Customs and Central Excise)
With the passing of the Government of India Act, 1919 the civil services—under the oversight of the Secretary of State for India—were split into two arms, the All India Services, and the Central Services. Apart from the Central Secretariat, the more important of these latter were the Railway Services, the Indian Posts and Telegraph Service, and the Imperial Customs Service. After Independence, the Imperial Customs Service was reconstituted as the Indian Revenue Service (Customs and Central Excise) in 1953.

The nature of the service underwent a transformational change with the enactment of the One Hundred and First Amendment of the Constitution of India, which overhauled the administration of indirect taxation in India with the introduction of the Goods and Services Tax (GST). With the subsumption of several indirect taxes and levies, including central excise duty and service tax, under the GST, the nomenclature was updated to reflect the changed structure of taxation from IRS (Customs and Central Excise) to IRS (Customs and Indirect Taxes).

Recruitment
There are two streams of recruitment to the Indian Revenue Service. IRS officers may enter the IRS by passing the Civil Services Examination (CSE). The CSE is a three-stage competitive selection process consisting of a preliminary examination, the main examination, and an interview. It is administered by the Union Public Service Commission (UPSC). IRS officers recruited in this way are called direct recruits.

Some IRS officers are also recruited from Central Services (Group B). These include Income Tax Service (Group B), Customs Appraisers Service (Group B), Customs Preventive Service (Group B), and Central Excise Service (Group B). Group 'B' officers are gradually promoted over several years of service. The current ratio of two streams at the entry level is kept at 1:1. All IRS officers, regardless of their mode of entry, are appointed by the President of India.

Training
After selection, successful candidates undergo a 3-month Foundation Course at the Lal Bahadur Shastri National Academy of Administration (LBSNAA) in Mussoorie, Uttarakhand,

Thereafter, IRS(IT) Officer Trainees (OTs) undergo a 16-month specialised training at the National Academy of Direct Taxes (NADT), in Nagpur, Maharashtra, while IRS(C&IT) OTs undergo specialised training at the National Academy of Customs Indirect Taxes and Narcotics (NACIN), in Faridabad, Haryana.

National Academy of Direct Taxes 

Sixteen months of Induction Training is conducted for the directly recruited officers of IRS(IT) at NADT each year. The training is designed into two modules to enable the Officer Trainees to acquire the knowledge and skills they need to function effectively and efficiently as tax administrators. In particular, training prepares OTs to deliver quality taxpayer services, detect and penalize non-compliance, and understand the macroeconomic, taxation, and fiscal policy of the Government of India to maximize revenue.

First Module 
The First Module emphasizes on giving intense theoretical inputs in the subjects such as Theoretical Concepts and Practical Application of Direct Tax Laws, Advanced Accounting and Finance, and Business Laws-I. It also includes a week-long Parliamentary Attachment, and a two-week Field Attachment. OTs also undergo short-duration training at NACIN, Faridabad, LBSNAA, Mussoorie, and the Sardar Vallabhbhai Patel National Police Academy (SVPNPA), Hyderabad. The first Departmental Examinations are conducted at the end of the first module.

Second Module
The second module includes On-The-Job Training for around eight weeks, followed by Bharat Darshan, and a Financial Attachment for 2 weeks. Further, The OTs are also exposed to the international tax practices through a one or two weeks International Attachment in France, Netherlands, Australia, Malaysia, South Africa, the US, or Singapore. OTs are also trained to apply theoretical concepts and acquire practical skills through the subjects of Procedure/Techniques of Investigation and Drafting of Orders and Reports, Information Technology and Operations, Management and Administration in the Income Tax Department, International Taxation and Transfer Pricing, Law of Governance and Ethics, and Business Laws-II. A number of guest lectures are organized to familiarize the trainees with the best practices in tax administration.

Officer Trainees are also expected to complete a project on Direct Tax Provisions for the award of a master's degree in Business Law and Taxation from NALSAR University of Law, Hyderabad at the time of Valediction from NADT.

National Academy of Customs, Indirect Taxes, and Narcotics
This involves very dynamic training in specialised matters of conventional tax administration— be it direct or indirect–along with unarmed combat, weapons, and explosives. Additionally, IRS officers undergo extensive training with the Army and the National Police Academy, and many other prestigious institutes of the country so that they are better prepared to excel in their multifaceted role. NADT and NACIN both have signed a memorandum of understanding with the National Law School of India University in Bengaluru to award postgraduate diplomas in business laws to the officer trainees. Recently, Finance Ministry has approved the exchange of officer trainees to various countries across the world such as the Netherlands, Belgium, Switzerland, France, Australia, Malaysia, United States of America, Brazil, South Africa and OECD Nations, for increasing exposure to the future administrators.

There are various mid-career training programmes (MCTP) for IRS officers to keep them abreast of the latest developments in the areas of governance, particularly taxation, finance and management. These include advanced mid-career training (AMCTP), which is conducted in 3 phases. Phase I is for joint and additional commissioners, Phase II is for commissioners and principal commissioners, and Phase III is for chief commissioners and principal chief commissioners. The AMCTP generally consists of a 3-week domestic module held at premier management institutes in the country followed by a 2-week international component at internationally acclaimed universities, depending on their areas of expertise.

Designations
The designations and time-scales within the Indian Revenue Service are as follows after cadre restructure:

IRS (Customs)

IRS (Income Tax)

Major concerns and reforms

Corruption
In 2015, it was reported that as many as 108 IRS officers were under probe by the CBI for their alleged involvement in corruption. From May 2009 to May 2010, the CBI had sought sanction for prosecution of 102 IRS officials posted in different parts of the country in connection with corruption cases.

In 2016, the Ministry of Finance, dismissed 72 and prematurely retired another 33 Indian Revenue Service officers for non-performance and on disciplinary grounds. In 2019, Government of India dismissed 12 (IRS IT) and 15 (IRS Customs and Central Excise) officers for corruption and bribery charges.

The IRS officials top the Central Bureau of Investigation’s list of most corrupt bureaucrats. In one case, a 1992 batch IRS officer was arrested for accepting a bribe of 2 crore in Mumbai. Recently, in another case, some IRS officials were found to help certain companies evade payment of Service tax and related penalties of the order of 1 crore. Also CBI raided premises of an income tax officer for demanding Bribe to the tune of 60 crore for covering up Stock Guru Scam.

Murder of many officers
Even though IRS officers have to deal with sensitive posting in their career they are not provided adequate security. Many IRS officers in the departments of customs and income tax have been assassinated in the course of their investigations.

Recent initiatives
Many new initiatives were taken by the Indian Revenue Service members to curb corruption in their respective departments and make the system more efficient and responsive to the needs of the taxpayers. Use of Technology widely reduced the scope for the abuse of power.
Refund Banker scheme introduced in 2007 eliminated the scope for corruption in the Refunds of Excessive Tax collected by the Department. Introduction of E-filing of Taxes and effective implementation of Permanent Account Number (PAN) are some revolutionary steps that reduced the scope for corruption at all levels while improving the efficiency of the whole system. Use of Centralised Processing Center setup in 2010 at Bangalore of the Income Tax Department reduced unnecessary delays in processing returns. These computerization initiatives have freed up the human resources in the department which are largely responsible for higher revenue collections.

Income Tax Ombudsmen was created in 2006 and is functional in 12 cities to look into tax-related grievances of the public. Department is also gearing to improve its tax payer's services with Sevottam Scheme. Under this scheme, various initiatives such as Citizen Charter, Ayakar Seva Kendra (ASK), which is a single Window mechanism for implementing Sevottam through the delivery of these services within the timelines promised in the Citizen's Charter, were launched. Aaykar Sampark Kendra consists of one National Call Centre and 4 regional Call Centres to aid the taxpayer were inaugurated by the Finance Minister.

IRS officers handling sensitive postings are issued a Glock Model 22 pistol or a Glock 23 in .40 S&W caliber.

An IRS officer could rise up to the Apex Scale (₹2,50,000 fixed plus allowances) at the post of principal chief commissioner of income tax in the ITD. At the apex level, he can also get selected as a Member or Chairperson of the CBDT. The intermediate grades in this career progression are deputy commissioner, joint commissioner, additional commissioner, commissioner, principal commissioner and chief commissioner of income tax. An IRS officer is also eligible to be selected as a member of the Income Tax Appellate Tribunal, Authority for Advance Ruling, Income Tax Settlement Commission and Income Tax Ombudsman as per the prescribed eligibility criteria.  Cadre Review has been cleared in the Income Tax Department creating 20,751 additional posts to help generate additional revenue of  crore annually.

See also 

 Civil Services of India
 All India Services
 Corruption in India

References

External links
 Official website of Indian Revenue Service
 Official website of Income Tax Department of India
 Training Academy for Members of Indian Revenue Service – Income Tax
 Training Academy for Member of Indian Revenue Service – Customs and Central Excise

Central Civil Services (India)
Taxation in India
India
Ministry of Finance (India)